Dr. Mono Mohan Das was a Congress politician and a Union Deputy Minister.

Early life
He was born in a Vaidya Family to Purna Chandra Das at Nawpara, Purba Bardhaman district, in March 1910. He was educated at Central Collegiate School, City College and Calcutta Medical College. He worked for some time as sanitary officer in Kolkata Corporation. He was married to Prativamoyee in 1933.

Political career
After being associated with Forward Bloc for a short period, he joined Congress in 1936. He was a member of the Constituent Assembly from 1948 to 1950 and of the Provisional Parliament from 1950 to 1952.

He was elected to the first  Lok Sabha in 1952 from one of the two seats of Burdwan (Lok Sabha constituency). The other seat was won by Atulya Ghosh. In 1957, he was elected from one of the two seats of the newly formed Asansol (Lok Sabha constituency). The other seat was won by Atulya Ghosh. Dr. Mono Mohan Das was elected to the Third Lok Sabha in 1962 from the newly created Ausgram (Lok Sabha constituency).

He served as Deputy Minister of Education from  May 1956 to April 1957; Deputy Minister of Education and Scientific Research from May 1957 to March 1958; and Deputy Minister of Scientific Research & Cultural Affairs from April 1958.

Death
Dr.Mono Mohan Das died on 13 December 1992 at the age of 82 years.

References

1910 births
1992 deaths
People from Purba Bardhaman district
Indian National Congress politicians
Lok Sabha members from West Bengal
India MPs 1952–1957
India MPs 1957–1962
India MPs 1962–1967